Sabal brazoriensis, also known as Sabal × brazoriensis, is a species of palm tree endemic to the Texas Gulf Coast, almost entirely in Brazoria County. This species was originally thought to be a hybrid of Sabal minor (dwarf palmetto) and Sabal mexicana (Mexican palmetto). However, genetic assessment concluded that it's lineage can be traced back to hybridization between S. minor and Sabal palmetto (cabbage palmetto). S. brazoriensis is considered a "species of hybrid origin" due to its genetic distinctness and isolation from the native range of S. palmetto, which only ventures to the Florida panhandle at its western extent.

Description 

Habitat 
This species is endemic to wet subtropical riparian forests, often referred to as the Colombia Bottomlands. The bulk of this ecosystem is housed in the San Barnard National Wildlife Refuge and is characterized by brackish and freshwater wetlands as well as forests adjacent to the Brazos and San Bernard rivers. Along with the brazoria palm, other trees that occur in this ecosystem include Quercus virginiana (southern live oak), Q. nigra (water oak), Fraxinus pennsylvanica (Green ash), Ulmus sp. (elms). and Ilex sp. (holly). Common understory plants include Malvaviscus drummondii (wax mallow), Rubus sp. (blackberry), Toxicodendron radicans (eastern poison ivy), and dwarf palmetto.

References 

brazoriensis
Plant nothospecies
Endemic flora of Texas
Flora of Texas